Pasarkemis is a district within Tangerang Regency in the province of Banten, on Java, Indonesia. It covers an area of 25.92 km2 and had a population of 238,377 at the 2010 Census and 273,659 at the 2020 Census.

References

Tangerang Regency
Districts of Banten
Populated places in Banten